Joseph Georges Philippe Goyette (born October 31, 1933) is a Canadian  former professional ice hockey center who played in the NHL for 16 seasons between 1956 and 1972.

Playing career
Goyette played 941 career NHL games, scoring 207 goals and 467 assists for 674 points. Goyette played his first 7 NHL seasons with the Montreal Canadiens. He spent another 7 seasons with the New York Rangers. Goyette's best offensive season was the 1969–70 season when, as a member of the St. Louis Blues, he scored 29 goals and 49 assists for 78 points (both career highs). Goyette played for the Blues for only one year, his 14th of 16 total seasons played, making it all the way to the 1970 Stanley Cup Finals. He had 3 goals and 11 assists in the team's 1970 playoff run. Goyette also spent two seasons with the Buffalo Sabres.

Coaching career
Goyette served as the first coach of the New York Islanders, but was replaced midway through his first season by the team by Earl Ingarfield Sr.  He never coached again, leaving his NHL coaching record at 6–38–4.

Career statistics

Regular season and playoffs

Coaching record

Career achievements and records
 Won the 1954-55 James Gatschene Memorial Trophy, IHL
 Won the 1954-55 George H. Wilkinson Trophy, IHL
 Won the 1969–70 Lady Byng Memorial Trophy
 Won Stanley Cup 1957, 1958, 1959 and 1960.
 In the 2009 book 100 Ranger Greats, was ranked No. 59 all-time of the 901 New York Rangers who had played during the team's first 82 seasons

References

External links
 

1933 births
Living people
Buffalo Sabres players
Canadian ice hockey centres
Canadian ice hockey coaches
Cincinnati Mohawks (IHL) players
Ice hockey people from Montreal
Lady Byng Memorial Trophy winners
Montreal Canadiens players
Montreal Junior Canadiens players
Montreal Royals (QSHL) players
New York Islanders coaches
New York Rangers players
People from Lachine, Quebec
St. Louis Blues players
Stanley Cup champions